Miloš Steigauf (born 5 December 1969 in Slaný) is a Czech javelin thrower. He has earned his living as a soldier.

He finished eleventh at the 1993 World Championships with a throw of 70.78 metres. He became the last Czechoslovakian champion in javelin throw, before the country's dissolution.

Achievements

External links

1969 births
Living people
Czech male javelin throwers
People from Slaný
Sportspeople from the Central Bohemian Region